Moenville is an extinct town in Haakon County, in the U.S. state of South Dakota. The GNIS classifies it as a populated place.

History
A post office called Moenville was established in 1908, and remained in operation until 1953. The town had the name of Gustave Moen, a pioneer merchant.

References

Ghost towns in South Dakota
Geography of Haakon County, South Dakota